Local elections were held in Parañaque on May 13, 2019 within the 2019 Philippine general election. Voters elected for the elective local posts in the city: the mayor, vice mayor, two congressmen, and the 16 councilors, eight each in the two local legislative districts of Parañaque.

Background
Mayor Edwin Olivarez ran for third and final term. He was challenged by his predecessor, former Mayor Florencio "Jun" Bernabe Jr.

Vice Mayor Jose Enrico "Rico" Golez ran for third and final term. He was challenged again by Jeremy Marquez.

First District Representative Eric Olivarez ran for third and final term. He was challenged by Jimmy Delos Santos.

Second District Representative Gustavo Tambunting was eligible to run for re-election, but chose not to run. His wife, Joy Myra Tambunting ran in his place. Tambunting was challenged by Pacifico Rosal.

Results
Names written in bold-Italic are the re-elected incumbents while in italic are incumbents lost in elections.

For District Representatives

First District
Rep. Eric Olivarez was re-elected.

Second District
Joy Myra Tambunting won the election.

For Mayor
Mayor Edwin Olivarez defeated Former Mayor Florencio "Jun" Bernabe.

For Vice Mayor
Vice Mayor Jose Enrico "Rico" Golez defeated Jeremy Marquez for the second time.

For Councilors

Team Bagong Parañaque (PDP–Laban/NPC)

Team Bernabe-Marquez (Lakas–CMD/HNP)

Independent politicians

1st District

|-bgcolor=black
|colspan=8|

2nd District

|-bgcolor=black
|colspan=8|

External links
2019 Election Results for the City of Parañaque

2019 Philippine local elections
Elections in Parañaque
May 2019 events in the Philippines
2019 elections in Metro Manila